The Mirpanj Mosque is related to the Qajar dynasty and is located in Shabestar County, Khamaneh.

References

Mosques in East Azerbaijan Province
Mosque buildings with domes
National works of Iran
Qajar architecture
Shabestar County